Løgten is a town in Aarhus Municipality, Central Denmark Region in Denmark. Løgten is close to the motorway Djurslandsmotorvejen between Skødstrup and Lisbjerg, the railway between Aarhus and Randers and is a station on the light rail system Aarhus Letbane. Løgten had a population of 8,659 (1 January 2022).

References

External links 

 Aarhus.dk – om Løgten-Skødstrup
 Siloetten in Løgten
 History of Skødstrup

Towns and settlements in Aarhus Municipality
Cities and towns in Aarhus Municipality